Eden is an unincorporated community in Green Township, Hancock County, Indiana.  It is home to the headquarters of a large building materials company, which has an atrium full of stuffed animals.

History
Eden was laid out and platted in 1835. A post office was established at Eden in 1834, and remained in operation until it was discontinued in 1905.

Geography

References

Unincorporated communities in Hancock County, Indiana
Unincorporated communities in Indiana
Indianapolis metropolitan area